I Want to Go Home is a 1981 children's novel by Gordon Korman.

I Want to Go Home may also refer to:

I Want to Go Home (1989 film), a 1989 French film
I Want to Go Home (2017 film), a 2017 documentary film

See also
"I Wanna Go Home"